This is a catalog for Nothing Records, organized alphabetically by catalog number:

Catalog

Discographies of American record labels
 
Rock music discographies
Discography